Brabourne Lees is a village in the civil parish of Brabourne, within the Ashford borough of Kent, England.
In 2021 it had a population of 1480.

The village was built on former pasture land ("lees") at the foot of the North Downs. Brabourne Baptist Church is at the junction of Calland and Plain Road; there is also a Zion Strict Baptist Chapel to the northeast of the village, on Canterbury Road.

See also
 Smeeth - village immediately to the south
 Lilyvale, Kent - hamlet to the east

References

External links

Villages in the Borough of Ashford